Tito Livio Burattini (8 March 1617 – 17 November 1681) was an inventor, architect, Egyptologist, scientist, instrument-maker, traveller, engineer, and nobleman, who spent his working life in Poland and Lithuania.  He was born in Agordo, Italy, and studied in Padua and Venice.  In 1639, he explored the Great Pyramid of Giza with English mathematician John Greaves; both Burattini and Sir Isaac Newton used measurements made by Greaves in an attempt to accurately determine the circumference of the earth.

For Germany in 1641, the court of King Ladislaus IV invited him to the Polish–Lithuanian Commonwealth. In Warsaw, Burattini built a model aircraft with four fixed glider wings in 1647.  Described as "four pairs of wings attached to an elaborate 'dragon'", it was said to have successfully lifted a cat in 1648 but not Burattini himself.  According to Clive Hart's The Prehistory of Flight, he promised that "only the most minor injuries" would result from landing the craft.

He later developed an early system of measurement based on time, similar to today's International System of Units; he published it in his book  (lit. "universal measure") in 1675 at Vilnius. "catholic [i.e. universal] metre"), a unit of length equivalent to the length of a free seconds pendulum; it differs from the modern metre by half a centimetre. He is considered the first to recommend the name metre for a unit of length.

Along with two others he met at Kraków, Burattini "performed optical experiments and contributed to the discovery of irregularities on the surface of Venus, comparable to those on the Moon". He made lenses for microscopes and telescopes, and gave some of them to Cardinal Leopoldo de' Medici.  He is also credited with building a calculating machine, which he donated to Grand Duke Ferdinando II, that borrows from both a Blaise Pascal machine and Napier's rods.  He died in Kraków, aged 64.

See also
John Wilkins

References

External links

 in the 9 May 1963 issue of Flight International
Nuncius: Annali di Storia della Scienza, issue 1998, especially section titled ""

1617 births
1681 deaths
17th-century Italian inventors
Polish indigenes
Italian scientific instrument makers
17th-century Polish businesspeople
Metrologists